Mohammed Al-Mohanadi (born 10 October 1972) is a Qatari football forward who played for Qatar in the 1984 Asian Cup. He competed in the men's tournament at the 1992 Summer Olympics.

References

References
Stats

Qatar international footballers
Qatari footballers
1984 AFC Asian Cup players
Living people
Association football forwards
Footballers at the 1992 Summer Olympics
Olympic footballers of Qatar
Place of birth missing (living people)
1972 births